Bryansford GAC is a Gaelic football and ladies' Gaelic football club in Newcastle, County Down, Northern Ireland. Founded in 1926, their most notable period was in 1970, when they won the Ulster Senior Club Football Championship.

Honours 
Ulster Senior Club Football Championship: 2
1969, 1970
Down Senior Football Championship: 11
1939, 1940, 1941, 1942, 1969, 1970, 1971, 1973, 1974, 1977, 2003

Notable players
 Éamonn Burns
Kalum King
Declan Murray
 fionn mckibbin
 lewis casement
 Cathal Burns - the man the myth the legend

References

External links 
Official site
Facebook page

Gaelic games clubs in County Down
Gaelic football clubs in County Down
Newcastle, County Down